Jetmate or JetMate may refer to:

NEC Jetmate, a series of NEC thermal inkjet printers in the 1980s
Transcend JetMate, a laser printer driver to render Chinese characters by Transcend in ca. 1988